Wim Bos Verschuur, born Bernard Willem Hendrik Verschuur (23 May 1904 – 4 January 1985) was a Surinamese politician, activist, artist, and writer. On 30 July 1943, he was arrested and interned for opposing governor Johannes Kielstra; this caused a major scandal in Surinam politics and led to a larger wave of repression against opposition figures.

Biography
Verschuur was born on 23 May 1904 in Paramaribo, across the street from the Palace of the Governor, as Bernard Willem Hendrik Verschuur. After finishing the MULO, Verschuur went to the Netherlands for an art teacher's degree. In 1933, Verschuur returned to Suriname, and became an art teacher. 

Verschuur became a chairman of the Surinaamse Arbeiders Federatie (Surinamese Workers Federation). In 1936, he wrote the play Woeker about the greed of the banks and credit unions. Verschuur was also politically active for home-rule in Suriname.

In 1942, he was elected to the Estates of Suriname. Governor Johannes Kielstra had used World War II to increase his power, and had received a mandate to circumvent the Estates. On 23 July 1943, Verschuur petitioned Queen Wilhelmina to remove Kielstra from office. On 30 July 1943, he was arrested and interned without trial, eventually ending up in the Copieweg internment camp which mostly held German and South Africans.

The arrest caused much indignation in Suriname. Further internments of political adversaries like Eddy Bruma and Otto Huiswoud followed. Seven members of the Estates resigned in protest thereby denying the quorum, and blocking any legislation to be passed. The magazine of the Moravian Church was shut down for speaking out against Kielstra, and the church was threatened with a denial of all subsidies. Finally, on 28 December 1943, the Dutch government-in-exile discharged Kielstra. Verschuur was released on 27 October 1944. 

Verschuur was re-elected in 1945, and served until 1951. In 1947, he was knighted in the Order of Orange-Nassau. In 1949, he was one of the founders of the Surinaams Museum. In 1952, he established Party Suriname, but failed to be elected. In 1955, he was re-elected as part of the Unity Front, and served until 1958.

He published many magazines and pamphlets during his life. He wrote three books, but never published them. In 2017, Het vergeten land was published by the Surinaams Museum.

Verschuur died on 4 January 1985 at the age of 80.

References

Bibliography 
 

1904 births
1985 deaths
Members of the National Assembly (Suriname)
Knights of the Order of Orange-Nassau
People from Paramaribo
Surinamese male writers
Surinamese painters
Surinamese politicians